Bangladesh Army University of Science and Technology (BAUST) is an army-backed university in Saidpur, Bangladesh.

History
Bangladesh Army University of Science and Technology is one of the universities run by Bangladesh Army; approved by Prime Minister Sheikh Hasina on February 12, 2015. On February 15, 2015, It was inaugurated by Asaduzzaman Noor, former Minister of Cultural Affairs Ministry of Bangladesh in the presence of senior army officers of Bangladesh Army.

Location
The main campus is located in Saidpur with infrastructure support from Saidpur Cantonment. Saidpur is a town of Nilphamari district in Bangladesh, part of the Rangpur Division. Saidpur Airport is very close to the university campus.

Faculties 

4 years B.Sc. undergraduate courses and engineering courses

Faculty of Electrical and Computer Engineering (ECE)

 Department of Computer Science & Engineering
 Department of Electrical & Electronic Engineering
 Department of Information & Communications Technology

Faculty of Mechanical Engineering (ME)
 Department of Mechanical Engineering
 Department of Industrial & Production Engineering

Faculty of Civil Engineering(CE)
 Department of Civil Engineering

Faculty of Business Studies 
 Department of Business Administration
 Department of Accounting and Information Systems

Faculty of Science & Humanities 
 Department of English
 Department of Arts and Sciences

Regulatory bodies

Academic Council of BAUST

Chairman 
 Vice Chancellor, Bangladesh Army University of Science and Technology

Members 
 Pro Vice Chancellor
 All Deans
 All Department/Institute Heads
 One Professor from Each Department
 Three Education Patron Nominated by Board of Trustees
 Two Educationalist Nominated by Syndicate

Member secretary 
 Registrar, BAUST

Student life
To break the monotony of study different cultural programs are arranged at regular intervals.

Student's dress
It is mandatory for students to wear dress with displayed identity card as per 'Dress Code' prescribed by BAUST authority.

Halls of residence 
BAUST has individual halls for male and female students. Hostel administration is performed by the provost who is selected from one of the senior teachers of the all departments or Ex-Army Officer.

Abbas Uddin Ahmed Hall
Abbas Uddin Ahmed Hall (A U Ahmed Hall) is named after Abbasuddin Ahmed, the famous folk artist of Bangladesh. A U Ahmed Hall is a 4 storied building with only male students, having a capacity of 500 students. There are 20 staffs for hall. A U Ahmed Hall is known for the security of the students compared to the other hall in the country. Students get various modern facilities such as 24-hour electricity, 24/7 internet service, gym, games and sports facilities. Annual hall festival is being celebrated in November of every year.

Bir Protik Taramon Bibi Hall
Bir Protik Taramon Bibi Hall is named after Bir Protik Taramon Bibi, one of the two female freedom fighters in Bangladesh who had engaged in direct combat during the liberation war of Bangladesh in 1971 as a member of the Mukti Bahini (Liberation Army). Bir Protik Taramon Bibi hall is an 2 storied building with only female students, having a capacity of 300 students. There are 20 staffs for hall. As other two Halls, it is also known for the security of the students compared to the other hall in the country. Annual hall festival is being celebrated in November of every year like other two Halls.

Shaheed Dr. Zikrul Haque Hall
Shaheed Dr. Zikrul Haque Hall is named after Dr. Zikrul Haque,  was a physician and politician who was elected to the National Assembly of Pakistan in 1970. He was killed in the Bangladesh Liberation war and is considered a Martyr in Bangladesh.Shaheed Dr. Zikrul Haque Hall (Formerly New Hall) is a 5 storied building with only male students, having a capacity of 500 students. There are 20 staffs for hall. Shaheed Dr. Zikrul Haque Hall is known for the security of the students compared to the other hall in the country. Students get various modern facilities such as 24-hour electricity, 24/7 internet service, gym, games and sports facilities. Annual hall festival is being celebrated in November of every year.

References

External links 
 
 ইঞ্জিনিয়ারিং বইয়ের মোড়ক উন্মোচন | প্রথম আলো
 প্রযুক্তি ও উৎসবের দিন | প্রথম আলো
 BAUST “EEE DAY, 2018” 

Universities and colleges in Nilphamari District
2015 establishments in Bangladesh
Educational institutions established in 2015
Bangladesh Army
Educational Institutions affiliated with Bangladesh Army